Callidrepana is a genus of moths belonging to the subfamily Drepaninae.

Species
Callidrepana albiceris (Swinhoe, 1907)
Callidrepana amaura (Warren, 1901)
Callidrepana argenteola (Moore, [1860])
Callidrepana argyrobapta (Gaede, 1914)
Callidrepana gelidata (Walker, [1863])
Callidrepana gemina Watson, 1968
Callidrepana heinzhuebneri Buchsbaum, Brüggemeier & Chen, 2014
Callidrepana hirayamai Nagano, 1918
Callidrepana jianfenglingensis Li, Hu & Wang, 2014
Callidrepana macnultyi Watson, 1965
Callidrepana micacea (Walker, 1862)
Callidrepana nana Warren, 1922
Callidrepana ovata Watson, 1968
Callidrepana patrana (Moore, [1866])
Callidrepana pulcherrima (Hampson, [1893])
Callidrepana saucia Felder, 1861
Callidrepana serena Watson, 1965
Callidrepana splendens (Warren, 1897)
Callidrepana vanbraeckeli Gaede, 1934

References

 , 2014: A new species of Callidrepana Felder, 1861 (Lepidoptera: Drepanidae) from Hainan, China. Tinea 22(5): 316–317.
Entomofauna, Suppl. 17: 45–53.

External links

Drepaninae
Drepanidae genera